The black-bellied storm petrel (Fregetta tropica) is a species of seabird in the family Oceanitidae.

It is found in Antarctica, Argentina, Australia, Bouvet Island, Brazil, Chile, Falkland Islands, French Polynesia, French Southern Territories, Madagascar, Mozambique, New Zealand, Oman, Peru, Saint Helena, São Tomé and Príncipe, Solomon Islands, South Africa, South Georgia and the South Sandwich Islands, Uruguay, and Vanuatu.

Description 
They are usually black with a white band over the rump and white under the wings and on the flanks. A broad black stripe runs down the center of the belly, but may be broken or absent altogether. They have long legs, so the feet can be seen beyond the tail in flight. The legs and feet are black.

They are silent mostly at sea. Noises can be heard from the breeding colonies; birds on the ground give a drawn-out shrill whistle.

References

External links
 Black-bellied storm-petrel [Fregetta tropica] - photos, Christopher Taylor Nature Photography
 Black-bellied storm petrel first record for Western Palearctic

black-bellied storm petrel
Birds of islands of the Atlantic Ocean
Birds of subantarctic islands
Birds of the Indian Ocean
Fauna of the Prince Edward Islands
Fauna of the Crozet Islands
Birds of Antarctica
black-bellied storm petrel
Articles containing video clips
Taxonomy articles created by Polbot